Erigeron vetensis  is a North American species of flowering plant in the family Asteraceae known by the common name early blue-top fleabane. It is native to the western United States (primarily in the Rocky Mountains of Wyoming, Colorado, and New Mexico but with an isolated population in Nebraska).

Erigeron vetensis  grows in dry, open sites in openings in conifer forests. It is a perennial herb up to 50 centimeters (20 inches) tall. It generally produces only one flower head per stem. Each head contains 30–90; blue, purple, or white ray florets surrounding numerous yellow disc florets.

References

vetensis
Flora of the Western United States
Plants described in 1905
Flora without expected TNC conservation status